Beukes is a surname. Notable people with the surname include:

Carl Beukes (born 1976), South African actor
Dricky Beukes (1918–1999), South African novelist 
Hans Beukes, Namibian writer
Herbert Beukes, South African diplomat
Hermanus Beukes (1913-2004), South African politician
Jonathan Beukes (born 1979), South African cricket player
Lauren Beukes (born 1976), South African novelist
Priscilla Beukes, Namibian politician
Roelf Beukes, South African military commander